Experienced is a live CD and DVD set by Japanese electronica/rock duo Boom Boom Satellites. Released on February 23, 2011, the album consists of a recording of their performance at Chiba's Makuhari Messe, the last stop of their Japan Tour 2010 2nd Stage. The set list mainly features tracks from their 2010 studio album To the Loveless. Mastering of the album was completed on January 6, 2011, as announced by the band's Twitter account.

Track listing

References

External links
 Boom Boom Satellites official website

2011 live albums
Boom Boom Satellites albums
Gr8! Records albums